Felipe Gabuco (born May 26, 1916, date of death unknown) was a Filipino boxer who competed in the 1936 Summer Olympics. In 1936 he was eliminated in the first round of the featherweight class after losing his fight to Theodore Kara.

1936 Olympic results
Below is the record of Felipe Gabuco, a Filipino featherweight boxer who competed at the 1936 Berlin Olympics:

 Round of 32: lost to Theodore Kara (United states) referee stopped contest in the third round

References
Felipe Gabuco's profile at Sports Reference.com

External links
 

1916 births
Year of death missing
Featherweight boxers
Olympic boxers of the Philippines
Boxers at the 1936 Summer Olympics
Filipino male boxers